The Wisconsin Department of Public Instruction, headquartered in Madison, is the state education and public library management agency in the state of Wisconsin. The department is led by the State Superintendent of Public Instruction, a non-partisan, constitutional officer elected every four years in the spring primary, six months after the previous year's presidential election.

Jill Underly is the current superintendent, elected in 2021.

References

External links
 Wisconsin Department of Public Instruction
 

Public education in Wisconsin
State departments of education of the United States
Public Instruction